The Beautiful Brummel (Spanish: El Hermoso Brummel) is a 1951 Argentine historical comedy film directed by Julio Saraceni and starring Fidel Pintos, Delfy de Ortega and Amadeo Novoa. The film's sets were designed by the art director Gori Muñoz.

Plot
In the early nineteenth century a valet impersonates his master.

Cast
  Fidel Pintos
  Delfy de Ortega
  Amadeo Novoa
  Susana Campos
  Carlos Barbetti
  Carlos Enríquez 
  Julia Sandoval
  Lucio Deval
  Alberto Terrones
  Irma Roy
  María Esther Rodrigo
  Ricardo Legarreta
  Pedro Aleandro
  Daniel Tedeschi…Extra
  Mario Pocoví
 Julián Bourges

External links
 

1951 films
1950s historical comedy films
Argentine historical comedy films
1950s Spanish-language films
Argentine black-and-white films
Films directed by Julio Saraceni
Films set in the 19th century
Films with screenplays by Abel Santa Cruz
1951 comedy films
1950s Argentine films